Papilio andronicus is a species of swallowtail butterfly from the genus Papilio that is found in Cameroon.

References

Endemic fauna of Cameroon
andronicus
Butterflies described in 1871
Butterflies of Africa
Taxa named by Christopher Ward (entomologist)